Tournament is a 2010 Indian Malayalam-language road and sports film written, directed and produced by Lal starring Fahadh Faasil, Manu, Rupa Manjari and Praveen Prem. It started its shooting in August 2010 and was released on 25 December 2010. The film features songs by Deepak Dev and original score by Alex Paul. Cinematography was handled by Venu and Amal Neerad for a song.

Lal used a new format called play-replay, which is really the first in Malayalam film: One scene is replayed from different viewpoints after several scenes. Lal used this technique in the full length of the film.

Plot

The movie begins by introducing the main characters of the story, Usman Ali, Viswanathan and Balachandran playing cricket. Their coach informs the three that they are selected for APL Cochin team's final selection tournament in Bangalore. Excited, they celebrate and accidentally meets Aswathy Alex a freelance photographer. Right before the trip, Balachandran is injured while riding the bike and misses his trip to Bangalore. Unfortunately for Viswanathan and Usman, their flight gets cancelled due to a bomb threat. Aswathy then motivates then to take a road trip and have fun while travelling telling them that it will relax them. Bobby (whom they meet at the airport) also joins them in this trip. The rest of the trip they have a lot of adventure. Usman suffers from food poisoning while eating from a Dabba and is hospitalised. He misses the tournament due to this. The scene cuts back to the incident where Balachandran was injured. Now it shows that it was Usman who pulled a thread in between the roads and caused the accident to Balachandran. They proceed with their journey. But Vishwanathan hurts his leg when the jeep losses its control. They decide to halt the journey for a while. In the meanwhile, both Aswathy and Bobby then go to investigate John Subrahmaniyam. They meet a teashop owner who promises to help them investigate John. They enter John's house in the pretext of being his girlfriend's cousins. But John identifies them and warns them to stay away. But they engage in a fight and Bobby loses his consciousness. When he wakes up in the morning, he sees a dead Aswathy. But the tea shop owner rescues him. In the replay, we are shown that Aswathy is not dead. In another replay scene, it is shown that it was Bobby who opens the door causing Viswanathan to fall and break his leg. Tea shop owner asks Bobby to leave the place. Bobby drives away and we are revealed that the tea shop owner is actually John Subrahmaniyam. Now he regrets his action. Later Viswanathan becomes Man of the Match of the tournament. Bobby marries Aswathy in the presence of Viswanathan, Usman and Balachandran.

Cast

Soundtrack

The songs are composed by Deepak Dev, making this his first collaboration with Lal. The soundtrack album, which was released in December 2010, features six songs overall, with lyrics penned by Vayalar Sharath Chandra Varma. The song "Nila Nila" is repeated at the end of the album, with singer Karthik being credited for both songs.

Reception 

Paresh C Palicha from Rediff.com wrote "With Tournament, director Lal makes a departure from his typical mimicry humour. But the film falls into the genre of crass comedy, which is a huge disappointment" Sify.com wrote "Tournament has its moments and the ?replay? format gets the viewers involved in the storyline right from the beginning itself. But then, that turns out to be the problem with the film as well, as the plot seems to be too simple to become a taut thriller"

References

External links
 

2010 films
2010s road movies
Indian road movies
2010s Malayalam-language films
Films directed by Lal